In mathematics, the Humbert polynomials π(x) are a generalization of Pincherle polynomials introduced by  given by the generating function

.

See also

Umbral calculus

References

Polynomials